

Televisa

1950s

See also
List of Televisa telenovelas (1960s)
List of Televisa telenovelas (1970s)
List of Televisa telenovelas (1980s)
List of Televisa telenovelas (1990s)
List of Televisa telenovelas (2000s)
List of Televisa telenovelas and series (2010s)
List of Televisa telenovelas and series (2020s)

TV Azteca

Grupo Imagen

See also
 Television in Mexico

References

Telenovelas

Dynamic lists
Lists of telenovelas
Telenovelas